The Palawan bearded pig (Sus ahoenobarbus) is a pig species in the genus Sus endemic to the Philippines, where it occurs on the archipelago of islands formed by Balabac, Palawan, and the Calamian Islands.

Taxonomy 
Until recently, it was considered a subspecies of the Bornean bearded pig (Sus barbatus), but at least under the phylogenetic species concept, it must be classified as a separate species. For its treatment under other (and more widely used) species concepts, more study is required, but the presently available information seems to argue for full species status in any case.

Fossils
Fossils excavated in Palawan were identified as being of the Palawan bearded pig, deer, Philippine long-tailed macaques, tiger, small mammals, lizards, snakes and turtles. From the stone tools, besides the evidence for cuts on the bones, and the use of fire, it would appear that early humans had accumulated the bones.

Borneo might have been connected to Palawan during the penultimate and previous glacial periods, judging from the molecular phylogeny of murids. Remains of pigs were compared with the wild boar (Sus scrofa)and Palawanese wild boar (Sus ahoenobarbus). It is known that the wild boar was imported as a domesticate to the islands from mainland Southeast Asia during the late Holocene.

See also
 Puerto Princesa Subterranean River National Park, Palawan

References

Sus (genus)
Mammals of the Philippines
Endemic fauna of the Philippines
Fauna of Palawan
Mammals described in 1888